Alan Vest (born 5 September 1939) is an English-born New Zealand former football player and manager from Barnsley, England. He currently resides in Perth, Australia.

Biography
Vest had a notable playing career, scoring on his full international debut for the All Whites in a 4–1 win over New Caledonia on 17 September 1972 and ended his international playing career with 17 A-international caps and 6 goals to his credit, his final cap being in a 0–0 draw with Iran on 12 August 1973.

Vest first coached Rugby Town in the 1960s and then Rochdale United. It is in Australia where Vest has made his mark with the Yorkshire-man coaching NSL teams when they were at their peak in the 1970s. After stints in New Zealand and in Perth as a director of coaching at the Football Federation of Western Australia. Vest spent time in Asia with Sarawak and  Geylang United  before returning to Australia.

Managerial honours

Sarawak FA
Premier League (1): 1997
FA Cup Malaysia (1): 1992
Charity Shield Malaysia (1): 1998

Perth Glory FC
National Soccer League (2): 2002–2003, 2003–04

References

External links

1939 births
Living people
Spalding United F.C. players
New Zealand association footballers
New Zealand association football coaches
New Zealand international footballers
New Zealand people of English descent
Sarawak FA managers
Perth Glory FC managers
Geylang International FC head coaches
Expatriate soccer managers in Australia
Newcastle KB United players
Rugby Town F.C. (1945) players
A-League Men managers
Association football forwards
1973 Oceania Cup players